Sheila Krumholz (born 20th century) is an American nonprofit executive.

She serves as the executive director of OpenSecrets, a research group based in Washington, D.C.

See also

 List of people from Washington, D.C.
 List of University of Minnesota people

References

Further reading

External links

Year of birth missing (living people)
Place of birth missing (living people)
20th-century births
American political activists
American nonprofit executives
Living people
Open government activists
People from Washington, D.C.
University of Minnesota alumni
American political women
Women nonprofit executives
21st-century American women